The 1967 CONCACAF Champions' Cup was the 3rd edition of the annual international club football competition held in the CONCACAF region (North America, Central America and the Caribbean), the CONCACAF Champions' Cup. It determined that year's club champion of association football in the CONCACAF region.

The tournament was played by 10 teams of 10 nations: Netherlands Antilles, Bermuda, El Salvador, United States, Guatemala, Haiti, Honduras, Jamaica, Nicaragua, Trinidad and Tobago. The tournament was played from 6 August 1967 till 24 March 1968.

The teams were split in 3 zones (North American, Central American and Caribbean), each one qualifying the winner to the final tournament, where the winners of the North and Central zones played a semi-final to decide who was going to play against the Caribbean champion in the final. All the matches in the tournament were played under the home/away match system.

Alianza from El Salvador won the final, and became CONCACAF champion for the first time.

North American Zone
The Zone was scratched and  Philadelphia Ukrainians advanced to the North/Central American Zone Final as they were the only entrant.

Central American Zone

First round

Second round

Caribbean Zone

All matches played in Kingston, Jamaica.
Jong Colombia wins group stage, advances to the Final.

North vs Central playoff

Final

First leg

Second leg 

Goal difference was not taken into account. As both teams won a game, a re-match was required.

Playoff

Champion

References

1
CONCACAF Champions' Cup